Badmaash is a 1998 Indian Bollywood film directed by Goutam Pawar. It stars Jackie Shroff and Shilpa Shirodkar in pivotal roles.

Cast
 Jackie Shroff as Gautam Hiraskar
 Shilpa Shirodkar as Geeta
 Paresh Rawal as Lalu Seth
 Pran as Kashinath Hiraskar
 Bindu as Vimla
 Viju Khote as Constable Gawde
 Tej Sapru as Dilip

Soundtrack
Lyrics were penned by Ibrahim Ashq.

References

External links

1990s Hindi-language films
1998 films
Films scored by Surinder Sodhi